Acianthera angustifolia  is a species of orchid plant native to Central America.

References 

angustifolia
Flora of Belize
Flora of Guatemala
Flora of Honduras
Flora of Mexico
Flora of Nicaragua